Gangadhar (1936–2003) was an Indian actor known for his work in Kannada cinema. A character actor who transitioned from stage to films in the mid-1960s, he had a brief period of success when his performances in social-dramas such as Gejje Pooje (1969), Sharapanjara (1971) and Seetha (1970) were noted. In addition to the former two, he starred in Katha Sangama (1975) and Ranganayaki (1981), all of which were directed by Puttanna Kanagal. Other films he starred in include Nanna Thamma (1970),  Aliya Geleya (1971) and Bhale Adrushtavo Adrushta (1972).

Gangadhar returned to stage in the 1980s after film opportunities failed to come his way; poor health condition led him to retire from acting in 1995, when he was aged 59. Gangadhar appeared in a total of 80 Kannada-language films and was awarded the Rajyotsava Award by the government of Karnataka in recognition of his contribution to Kannada cinema. He died in 2003, aged 67

Early life 
Gangadhar was born in 1936. He obtained a diploma in mechanical engineering before beginning to work in Hindustan Aeronautics Limited (HAL) in Bangalore. While there, he staged plays like Samsare Nauke, Echamanayaka and Vijayotsava. He had achieved considerable success during his time at the theatre group Prabhat Kalavidaru.

Career 
A makeup artist, Mahadevaiah, introduced Gangadhar to filmmaker G. V. Iyer, who cast him in Chowkada Deepa (1969) in the lead role. He was credited as Rajendra Kumar for the film. The film also marked the debut of actor Srinath. The film was an attempt to blend into the hitherto onset of Parallel cinema, but failed to perform well. However, Gangadhar's first release was the Rajkumar-starrer Lagna Pathrike (1967). He played a stage actor in the film. After Chowkada Deepa, he starred in Puttanna Kanagal's successful film, Gejje Pooje (1969), alongside Kalpana. He subsequently appeared in Nanna Thamma (1970), playing the brother of Rajkumar's character. He was paired opposite Kalpana again in Seetha (1970). A popular collaboration during the time, the two went on to star together subsequently in Sotu Geddavalu (1971), Yaava Janmada Maitri (1972) and Bhale Adrushtavo Adrushta (1972). In Bandhavya (1972), he played a Raja, a thief and a brother of K. S. Ashwath's character, who reforms himself in order to pursue his love interest.

The year 1971 saw seven releases starring Gangadhar, including the hugely successful Sharapanjara and B. R. Panthulu's Aliya Geleya. Gangadhar's Satish played husband of a postpartum psychosis-affected Kaveri (played by Kalpana) in Sharapanjara, who interns her to a mental asylum, before beginning to have an extramarital affair with an office colleague. Upon her return home after recovery, he mistreats her often reminding her of the illness. In 1972, Gangadhar had a total of four releases. He played Chennappa in Kanagal's anthology film Katha Sangama (1975), as the husband of a blind woman (played by Aarathi). Based on the novel Munithaayi, the plot follows Chennappa's struggle after knowing that his wife is raped by Rajinikanth's character. The remainder of the 1970s and 1980s saw less opportunities coming Gangadhar's way. Film historian Hariharapura Manjunath attributes it to the emergence of other leading men during the time such as Vishnuvardhan, Ambareesh and Shankar Nag among others. Gangadhar made occasional screen appearances in the 1980s; one notable role came in Bhakta Prahlada (1983), in which he played the Hindu deity Indra. In Mutthu Ondu Mutthu (1979), he played the father of female lead's character; in Jeevakke Jeeva (1981), a negative-shaded character; and in Karna (1986), the brother of Vishnuvardhan's character. During this time, Gangadhar returned to theatre and worked for a period of 12 years.

Personal life 
The 1990s saw worsening health condition of Gangadhar as he was ailing from diabetes, kidney-related illness and deteriorating eyesight. This was evident during the film of Aata Hudugata (1995), which was his last screen appearance. In one of his last public appearances, the annual Kannada Film Directors Association event at the Chowdiah Memorial Hall, Bangalore, in April 2001, he teared up lamenting his deteriorating eyesight stating he was looking forward for his death. After prolonged illness, Gangadhar died at 11:15 p.m. (IST) on 27 December 2003 in Bangalore, aged 67.

Partial filmography

References

External links 
 

Indian male film actors
Male actors in Kannada cinema
2003 deaths
1936 births
20th-century Indian male actors
Male actors from Bangalore
Indian male stage actors
Male actors in Kannada theatre
Recipients of the Rajyotsava Award 2003